NB, Nb, or nb may refer to:

Arts and entertainment
 N.B. (album), an album by Natasha Bedingfield
 NB (TV programme), a Scottish arts television programme that aired 1989–1997

Businesses
 NB Global, a British investment company
 New Balance, a shoe company
 Nigerian Breweries, a beverage company
 Sterling Airlines, a defunct Danish airline (IATA designator)
 National bank (disambiguation) several banks

Language
 Nota bene, often abbreviated as NB or n.b., a Latin phrase meaning "note well"
 nb, ISO 639-1 code for Bokmål, the written standard of the Norwegian language
 牛屄 (niúbī), a common word in Mandarin Chinese profanity

Places
 New Brunswick, a province of Canada, (postal abbreviation: NB)
 Nebraska, US, (former postal abbreviation: NB; changed to NE)

Science and technology
 Niobium, symbol Nb, a chemical element
 NB class, Australian steam locomotives
 Boeing NB, a 1923 training aircraft
 Naive Bayes classifier, in statistics
 Neuroblastoma, a type of cancer
 Nominal bore or nominal pipe size, a set of standard sizes for pipes
 Nanobarn (nb), a unit of cross-sectional area
 Mazda MX-5 (NB), the second generation of the Mazda MX-5
 NB (programming language), an intermediate-stage language known as "New B" that evolved from the "B" language and then further evolved into the "C" language

Other uses
 Narrowboat ship prefix
 National Battlefield, a protected area in the United States
 No-ball in cricket 
 Non-binary, a term used by people who identify as neither male nor female.

See also